WHUC (1230 AM) is a radio station broadcasting the country music format of WRWD-FM (107.3).  Licensed to Hudson, New York, the station serves the Upper Hudson Valley.  The station is owned by iHeartMedia (as iHM Licenses, LLC).  WHUC's radio studios are in Arlington, New York, and its transmitter is in Lorenz Park, New York.

WHUC is powered at 1,000 watts non-directional.  In August 2013, programming began being simulcast on FM translator W296AT at 106.9 MHz.

History

WHUC began broadcasting October 21, 1947, with 250 watts of power. It was owned by Colgren Broadcasting Company.

It previously featured adult standards programming from the America's Best Music network from Dial Global, as well as news from NBC News Radio. As of January 2013, the station began simulcasting 107.3 WRWD-FM in Poughkeepsie, New York.

References

External links

HUC
Radio stations established in 1947
1947 establishments in New York (state)
IHeartMedia radio stations
Country radio stations in the United States